Ahmed Raza (born 18 March 1983) is a Pakistani first-class cricketer who played for Multan cricket team.

References

External links
 

1983 births
Living people
Pakistani cricketers
Multan cricketers
People from Rahim Yar Khan District